Minuscule 363 (in the Gregory-Aland numbering), δ 455 (Soden), is a Greek minuscule manuscript of the New Testament, on parchment. Paleographically it has been assigned to the 14th century. 
It was adapted for liturgical use.

Description 

The codex contains the text of the New Testament except Book of Revelation on 306 parchment leaves with a catena. It is written in one column per page, in 32 lines per page.

The order of books: Gospels, Acts, Pauline epistles, Catholic epistles.

Text 

The Greek text of the codex is a representative of the Byzantine text-type. Hermann von Soden assigned it to the textual family Kr. Aland did not place it to any of Categories. According to the Claremont Profile Method it represents textual family Kr in Luke 1, Luke 10, and Luke 20. It also creates the textual pair with minuscule 290.

The Pericope Adulterae  (John 7:53-8:11) is marked by an obelus.

History 

The manuscript was added to the list of New Testament manuscripts by Scholz (1794–1852). 
It was examined by Bandini, Scholz, Burgon, and Gregory (1886).

The manuscript is currently housed at the Biblioteca Laurentiana (Plutei VI. 13) in Florence.

See also 

 List of New Testament minuscules
 Biblical manuscript
 Textual criticism

References

Further reading 

 

Greek New Testament minuscules
14th-century biblical manuscripts